This is a list of airlines currently operating in Costa Rica.

See also
 List of airlines
 List of defunct airlines of Costa Rica

References

Costa Rica

Airlines
Airlines
Costa Rica